Lynn is an unincorporated community and a census-designated place (CDP) located in and governed by Las Animas County, Colorado, United States. The population of the Lynn CDP was 12 at the United States Census 2010. The Aguilar post office (Zip Code 81020) serves the area.

Geography
Interstate 25 passes through the community, with access from Exit 34 (County Road 60).

Demographics

See also

Outline of Colorado
Index of Colorado-related articles
State of Colorado
Colorado cities and towns
Colorado census designated places
Colorado counties
Las Animas County, Colorado

References

External links

Las Animas County website

Census-designated places in Las Animas County, Colorado
Census-designated places in Colorado